Going Clear may refer to:

Going Clear (book), a 2013 book on Scientology by Lawrence Wright
Going Clear (film), a 2015 documentary by Alex Gibney based on the book